The Frankfort and Kokomo Railroad was a small railroad company that operated approximately  of track between the Indiana cities of Frankfort and Kokomo.  The F&K's rail line, laid down in 1873, was generally of poor condition and made the cars that traveled along it jog from side to side, leading to its nickname "The Rabbit Track Line".  The first train cars made the trip between the two cities on May 28, 1874.

In 1886, it was returned to  under the ownership of the Toledo, St. Louis and Kansas City Railroad, later renamed the Toledo, St. Louis and Western Railroad and commonly known as the "Clover Leaf".

References

Defunct Indiana railroads
Transportation in Clinton County, Indiana
Transportation in Howard County, Indiana
Predecessors of the Toledo, St. Louis and Western Railroad
Railway companies established in 1870
Railway companies disestablished in 1881
3 ft gauge railways in the United States
Narrow gauge railroads in Indiana